The following is a list of full-power radio stations, HD Radio subchannels and low-power translators in the United States broadcasting Air1 programming, which can be sorted by their call signs, frequencies, city of license, state and broadcast area.
Blue background indicates a low-power FM translator.
Gray background indicates an HD Radio subchannel.

References

External links
 

Air1 radio stations